Ingdalen is a village in the municipality of Orkland in Trøndelag county, Norway. Ingdal Chapel is located in the village. The village was once a part of the municipality of Stadsbygd which included land on both sides of the fjord, but in 1964 the Ingdalen area was separated from Stadsbygd and merged into Agdenes which was on the same side of the fjord.

References

Orkland
Villages in Trøndelag